Sidus (Hangul: 싸이더스 픽쳐스, formerly called Uno Film, Sidus and Sidus FNH) is a film production and distribution company based in Seoul, South Korea. Established in 1995, the company has distributed and produced over 70 films since their founding.

History
Sidus was founded by James Hyung Soon Kim after taking over Uno Films, which began in 1995. The company changed its name to Sidus in 2000 and merged with EBM, a talent management firm. The talent management and film production divisions split in 2005, with the former becoming iHQ (also known as SidusHQ). Also in 2005, Sidus was acquired by KT corporation, under which Sidus began investing in and distributing domestic and foreign films. In 2014, Sidus was acquired by Locus Corporation, which is headed by Sidus's original founder Kim. 

Sidus has produced over 70 films and continues to work in film production, distribution and investment on an international scale.

Filmography

Films

TV and web series

References 

Film distributors of South Korea
Film production companies of South Korea
KT Group
Mass media companies established in 1995
Companies based in Seoul
South Korean companies established in 1995
2005 mergers and acquisitions
2014 mergers and acquisitions